The Franco-Thai War (October 1940 – January 28, 1941,) was fought between Thailand and Vichy France over certain areas of French Indochina.

Negotiations with France shortly before World War II had shown that the French government was willing to make appropriate changes in the boundaries between Thailand and French Indochina, but only slightly. Following the Fall of France in 1940, Major-General Plaek Pibulsonggram (popularly known as "Phibun"), the prime minister of Thailand, decided that France's defeat gave the Thais an even better chance to regain the vassal state territories that were ceded to France during King Chulalongkorn's reign.

The German military occupation of Metropolitan France rendered France's hold on its overseas possessions, including French Indochina, tenuous. The colonial administration was now cut off from outside help and outside supplies. After the Japanese invasion of French Indochina in September 1940, the French were forced to allow Japan to set up military bases. This seemingly subservient behavior lulled  the Phibun regime into believing that France would not seriously resist a military confrontation with Thailand.

Opposing forces

French
The French military forces in Indochina consisted of an army of approximately 50,000 men, 12,000 of whom were French, organized into forty-one infantry battalions, two artillery regiments, and a battalion of engineers. The French Army had a shortage of armor, and it could field only 20 Renault FT tanks against the nearly one hundred Royal Thai Army armored vehicles. The bulk of the French forces stationed near the Thai border
consisted of the Indochinese infantry of the 3rd and 4th Regiments of Tonkinese Rifles (Tirailleurs Tonkinois), together with a battalion of Montagnards (indigenous Vietnamese highlanders), French regulars of the Colonial Infantry (Troupes coloniales), and French Foreign Legion units.

The French Navy had one light cruiser and four avisos in French Indochina .

The Vichy French Air Force (Armée de l'Air) had approximately 100 aircraft, of which roughly 60 could be considered front-line. These included thirty Potez 25 TOE reconnaissance/fighter-bombers, four Farman 221 heavy bombers, six Potez 542 bombers, nine Morane-Saulnier M.S.406 fighters, and eight Loire 130 reconnaissance/bomber flying boats.

Thai

The slightly larger Thai Army was a relatively well-equipped force. Consisting of 60,000 men, it was made up of four armies. The largest were the Burapha Army with five divisions and the Isan Army with three divisions. Independent formations under direct control of the army high command included two motorized cavalry battalions, one artillery battalion, one signals battalion, one engineer battalion, and one armored regiment. The artillery was a mixture of Krupp guns and modern Bofors guns and howitzers, while 60 Carden Loyd tankettes and 30 Vickers 6-ton tanks made up the bulk of the army's tank force.

The Royal Thai Navy included two Thonburi-class coastal defense ships, 12 torpedo boats, and four Japanese-made submarines. The Royal Thai Navy was inferior to the French naval forces in Southeast Asia, but the Royal Thai Air Force held both a quantitative and qualitative edge over the local Armée de l'Air units. Among the 140 aircraft that composed the Royal Thai Air Force's first-line strength were 24 Mitsubishi Ki-30 light bombers, nine Mitsubishi Ki-21 heavy bombers, 25 Curtiss Hawk 75N fighter planes, six Martin B-10 medium bombers, and 70 Vought O2U Corsair observation/attack aircraft.

Campaign
While nationalist demonstrations and anti-French rallies were being held in Bangkok, several border skirmishes erupted along the Mekong frontier. The superior Royal Thai Air Force then conducted daytime bombing runs over military targets in Vientiane, Phnom Penh, Sisophon, and Battambang with impunity. The French retaliated with their own air attacks, but the damage they caused was less than equal. The activities of the Thai air force, particularly in the field of dive-bombing, was such that Admiral Jean Decoux, the governor of French Indochina, grudgingly remarked that the Thai planes seemed to have been flown by men with plenty of war experience.

On 5 January 1941, following the report of a French attack on the Thai border town of Aranyaprathet, the Thai Burapha and Isan Armies launched an offensive on Laos and Cambodia. French response was instantaneous, but many units were simply swept aside by the better-equipped Thai forces. The Thai army swiftly overran Laos, but the French forces in Cambodia managed to rally and offer more resistance.

At dawn on January 16, 1941, the French launched a large counterattack on the Thai-held villages of Yang Dang Khum and Phum Preav, initiating the fiercest battle of the war. Due to poor coordination and nonexistent intelligence against the entrenched and well-prepared Thai forces, the French operation was stopped and fighting ended with a French retreat from the area. However, the Thais were unable to pursue the retreating French, as their forward tanks were kept in check by the gunnery of French Foreign Legion artillery.

With the situation on land rapidly deteriorating for the French, Admiral Decoux ordered all available French naval forces into action in the Gulf of Thailand. In the early morning of 17 January, a French naval squadron caught a Thai naval detachment by surprise at anchor off Ko Chang island. The subsequent Battle of Ko Chang was a tactical victory for the French and resulted in the sinking of two Thai torpedo boats and the disabling of a coastal defense ship, with the French suffering no casualties. Fearing the war would turn in France's favor, the Japanese intervened, proposing an armistice be signed.

On 24 January, the final air battle took place when Thai bombers raided the French airfield at Angkor, near Siem Reap. The last Thai mission bombing Phnom Penh commenced at 07:10 on 28 January, when the Martins of the 50th Bomber Squadron set out on a raid on Sisophon, escorted by thirteen Hawk 75Ns of the 60th Fighter Squadron.

Armistice

Japan subsequently stepped in to mediate the conflict. A general ceasefire had been arranged to go into effect at 10:00 on 28 January, and a Japanese-sponsored "Conference for the Cessation of Hostilities" was held at Saigon, with preliminary documents for an armistice between the governments of Marshal Philippe Pétain's French State and the Kingdom of Thailand signed aboard the cruiser Natori on 31 January 1941. On 9 May, a peace treaty was signed in Tokyo, with the French being coerced by the Japanese to relinquish their hold on the disputed border territories. France ceded the following provinces to Thailand from Cambodia and Laos:

 Battambang and Pailin, which were reorganized as Phra Tabong Province
 Siem Reap, Banteay Meanchey and Oddar Meanchey, which were reorganized as Phibunsongkhram Province
 Preah Vihear, which was merged with a part of Champassak Province of Laos opposite Pakse to form Nakhon Champassak Province
 Xaignabouli, including part of Luang Prabang Province, which was renamed Lan Chang Province

Treaty
The resolution of the conflict was widely acclaimed by the people of Thailand, and was seen as a personal triumph for Phibun. For the first time in its history, Thailand had been able to extract concessions from a European power, albeit a weakened one. For the French in French Indochina, the conflict was a bitter reminder of their isolation after the Fall of France. They felt that an ambitious neighbor had taken advantage of a distant colony being cut off from a weakened parent. Without hope of reinforcements, the French had little chance of offering a sustained resistance.

To commemorate the victory, Phibun erected the Victory Monument in Bangkok. Thailand invited Japan and Germany to join in the celebration of its construction.

The Japanese wanted to maintain both their working relationship with Vichy and the status quo; therefore, the Thais were forced to accept only a quarter of the territory that they gained from the French, in addition to having to pay six million piastres as a concession to the French.

However, the real beneficiaries of the conflict were the Japanese, who were able to expand their influence in both Thailand and Indochina. The Japanese wanted to use Thailand and Indochina as their military bases to invade British Burma and British Malaya later. The Japanese won from Phibun a secret verbal promise to support them in an attack on Malaya and Burma.
Phibun did not keep his word.

Relations between Japan and Thailand were subsequently stressed, as a disappointed Phibun switched to courting the British and Americans to ward off what he saw as an imminent Japanese invasion. However, on 8 December 1941, the Japanese invaded Thailand at the same time as the Japanese invasion of Malaya. Pearl Harbor was attacked one-and-a-half hours after Malaya and Thailand were. Fighting between Japanese and Thai forces lasted only five hours before a ceasefire was agreed. Thailand would be allied with Japan until 1945.

After the war, in October 1946, northwestern Cambodia and the two Lao enclaves on the Thai side of the Mekong River were returned to French sovereignty when the French provisional government threatened to veto Thailand's membership in the United Nations. This led to the conclusion of the Franco-Siamese Settlement Treaty of 1946 that settled the issue and paved the way to restoration of diplomatic relations between the two countries.

Casualties
The French army suffered a total of 321 casualties, of whom 15 were officers. The total number of missing after 28 January was 178 (six officers, 14 non-commissioned officers and 158 enlisted men). The Thais had captured 222 men (17 North Africans, 80 Frenchmen, and 125 Indochinese).

The Thai army suffered 54 men killed in action and 307 wounded. 41 sailors and marines of the Thai navy were killed, and 67 wounded. At the Battle of Ko Chang, 36 men were killed, of whom 20 belonged to HTMS Thonburi, 14 to HTMS Songkhla, and two to HTMS Chonburi. The Thai air force lost 13 men. The number of Thai military personnel captured by the French was just 21.

About 30 percent of the French aircraft were rendered unserviceable by the end of the war, some as a result of minor damage sustained in air raids that remained unrepaired. The Armée de l'Air admitted the loss of one Farman F221 and two Morane M.S.406s destroyed on the ground, but its losses were really greater.

In its first experience of combat, the Royal Thai Air Force claimed to have shot down five French aircraft and destroyed 17 on the ground, against the loss of three of its own in the air and another five to 10 destroyed in French air raids on Thai airfields.

See also
 Thailand in World War II
 Japanese occupation of Cambodia
 Japanese coup d'état in French Indochina
 HTMS Sri Ayudhya

References

Bibliography

Further reading
 Paloczi-Horvath, George.  "Thailand's War with Vichy France." History Today (1995) 45#3 pp 32–39.
 Wong, Ka F. Visions of a Nation: Public Monuments in Twentieth-Century Thailand, White Lotus, Bangkok 2006

External links
 "France 1940...something"
 
 The 1941 franco-siamese war in the World War II context
  La bataille de Koh Chang, netmarine.net

Conflicts in 1940
Conflicts in 1941
Wars involving France
Wars involving Thailand
Military history of Thailand during World War II
Military battles of Vichy France
1940 in France
1941 in France
1940 in Thailand
1941 in Thailand
Wars involving Vietnam
France–Thailand military relations
Franco-Thai War